The 2015 Austin Aztex season is the club's fourth season of existence. The club is now playing in the USL (formerly named USL Pro), the third tier of the American soccer pyramid. They were previously in the USL PDL the last 3 seasons, where they won the 2013 Championship, and the appeared in the Conference Finals in 2012 and 2014.  The Austin Aztex will be competing in the Western conference and will be playing their first season in the newly dubbed USL. The season will begin March 21 and conclude on September 20.

Background
After finding success in the USL PDL the first 3 seasons of their existence, which included the 2014 USL PDL League Championship, the Aztex made the jump to the newly renamed USL for this season.

In preparation for the move to USL Pro, the Aztex introduced a new logo and affiliated with the Columbus Crew SC, an MLS club which had also recently undergone a logo change.

Colors and badge
The Aztex kits are dark blue with gold numbers and gold trim.  Their alternate kits are white with gold trim and numbering.  Kits are provided by Admiral Sportswear.

The Aztex badge features blue and gold colors with a Texas lone star, a soccer ball, and the word "AzTeX" with an enlarged A, T, and X.  "ATX" is shorthand for Austin, Texas.

Players and staff

Current roster
As of March 11, 2015

Out on loan

Technical Staff 
As of February 25, 2015.

Competitions

Preseason

United Soccer League

League tables

Western Conference

Regular Season Matches 

As of September 20, 2015

U.S. Open Cup 
See 2015 U.S. Open Cup

As a Member of the USL, the Aztex automatically qualify into the second round with all 21 US based teams and face the winners of the first round regional matchup. At the time the First Round pairings are made, each USL team will be matched geographically to a specific First Round pairing and be scheduled to play its winner.

U.S. Open Cup Matches

References 

2015 USL season
American soccer clubs 2015 season
2015 in sports in Texas